Perth Bible College (abbreviated as PBC) is an evangelical interdenominational Christian tertiary theological institution, located in the Perth, suburb of , Western Australia.

Established in 1928 as the Perth Bible Institute, Perth Bible College has accreditation from the Australian Government's  Tertiary Education Quality and Standards Agency as a Higher Education Provider for its degree and diploma programs. In 2019 PBC had the distinction of being ranked first in the Federal Government's QILT survey of all Higher Education Providers in Australia.

Courses
Courses range from undergraduate to Master's degrees through ACCS and SCD. Diploma, Bachelor of Ministry and Graduate Diploma courses are accredited through the Australian Government in the AQF while the Master's degrees are offered through Perth Bible College as a campus of the Australian College of Christian Studies, accredited by the Sydney College of Divinity.

See also

 List of Bible colleges
 List of seminaries and theological colleges in Australia

References

Further reading

External links

Bible colleges
Seminaries and theological colleges in Australia
Education in Perth, Western Australia
1928 establishments in Australia
Educational institutions established in 1928
Evangelicalism in Australia